Repubblica (Republic in Italian) may refer to:

La Repubblica, an Italian newspaper
Repubblica (Milan Metro), a rail station in Milan, Italy
Milano Repubblica railway station, a station on the Milan Passante railway
Repubblica (fictional country), from the British TV series The Fast Show

See also

Republica, an English rock band